The Blackguard is 1923 novel by Raymond Paton. It is a melodrama set during the Russian Revolution of 1917. A French violinist rescues a Russian princess from execution at the hands of revolutionaries led by his former mentor.

Adaptation

The film was adapted for the screen when a silent film The Blackguard (1925) was made as a co-production between the British Gainsborough Pictures and the German UFA Studios. The film was directed by Graham Cutts.

References

Bibliography
 Cook, Pam (ed.). Gainsborough Pictures. Cassell, 1997.
 Kreimeier, Klaus. The Ufa story: a history of Germany's greatest film company, 1918-1945. University of California Press, 1999.

1923 British novels
British novels adapted into films
Novels set in the Russian Revolution